Ed Guerrero is an American  film historian and associate professor of  cinema studies and Africana studies in the  Department of Social and Cultural Analysis at New York University Tisch School of the Arts. His writings explore black cinema, culture, and critical discourse. He has written extensively on black cinema, its movies, politics and culture for anthologies and journals such as Sight & Sound, FilmQuartely, Cineaste, Journal of Popular Film & Television, and Discourse. Guerrero has served on editorial and professional boards including The Library of Congress' National Film Preservation Board.

Education and career
In 1972, Guerrero earned both a Bachelor of Arts degree in English Literature from San Francisco State University and an Master of Fine Arts degree in Filmmaking & Aesthetics from San Francisco Art Institute. He received a Doctor of Philosophy degree in Ethnic Studies, University of California, Berkeley in 1989. He was valedictorian.

He has served on the National Film Preservation Board since 1988.

Works

Exhibitions
1998: "Paul Robeson: Star of Stage and Screen,” curated for the Rutgers Paul Robeson Centennial Project,  retrospective at the UCLA Film & Television Archives (with Charles Musser, Mark Reid).
1999: "Borderlines: Paul Robeson and Film,” curated for MoMA (with Charles Musser).

Filmography

Bibliography 
Books

Essays

In media
Baadasssss Cinema: A Bold Look at 70's Blaxploitation Films (commentary).
In conversation with fellow international film scholars Ruth Ben-Ghiat and Shelleen Greene, and African-American, Afro-Latino and Afro-Italian actors in Blaxploitalian 100 Years of Blackness in Italian Cinema (2016).
Blaxploitation to Hip Hop, in which hip-hop artists "discuss the influence of blaxploitation films to the genre." (commentary)
In discussion with filmmakers and historians about C.S.A.: The Confederate States of America in Kevin Willmott's in 'C.S.A.' Roundtable.'
Infiltrating Hollywood: The Rise and Fall of the Spook Who Sat by the Door (commentary)
Pam Grier Super Foxy, in which "artists describe the influence Pam Grier  and her films have left in their music, art, and discuss her impact on culture in general." (commentary)
Through a Lens Darkly: Black Photographers and the Emergence of a People, a film that "explores how African American communities have used the camera as a tool for social change from the invention of photography to the present." (commentary)

Recognition
1979 Rockefeller Production/Post-Production Grant, PBS
1988 U.C. Santa Barbara Dissertation Fellowship 
1993-1994 Rockefeller Fellowship Program, in residence at University of Pennsylvania
1994 Honorable Mention, Theatre Library Association Award: Ed Guerrero. Framing Blackness: The African American Image in Film. Temple University Press, 1993.
1997 National Film Preservation Board appointment to the Society for Cinema Studies
US Department of State “Speaker Specialist” Grants: Serbia-Montenegro; Swaziland, S.A.; Norway & Denmark; Cape Town, S.A.

Cited in

Citations

External links

American academics
American film historians
Tisch School of the Arts faculty
New York University faculty
San Francisco State University alumni
San Francisco Art Institute alumni
21st-century American historians
American male non-fiction writers
Year of birth missing (living people)
21st-century American male writers
Living people